Wayne County High School is a public high school located in Waynesboro, Tennessee, United States.  It is part of the Wayne County School System.

References

External links
 WCHS Webpage

Schools in Wayne County, Tennessee
Public high schools in Tennessee